The Medina City Schools is a school district in Medina County, Ohio. The oldest school in the district is Garfield Elementary School.

Schools
The district includes the following Medina, Ohio schools:

References

External links
Official website

Education in Medina County, Ohio
School districts in Ohio